Potthast is a German surname.  Notable people with the surname include:

 August Potthast (1824–1898), German medieval historian and librarian
 Dan Potthast (born 1972), American guitarist, vocalist, songwriter
 Edward Henry Potthast (1857–1927), American impressionist painter
 Hedwig Potthast (1912–1997), private secretary and mistress of Reichsführer-SS Heinrich Himmler

German-language surnames